Josiah Kilgore House, now known as the Kilgore-Lewis House, is a historic home located at Greenville, South Carolina. It was built about 1838, and is a two-story, L-shaped, vernacular Palladian style dwelling on a low foundation.  It features a pedimented portico supported by square posts.  It has a projecting rear wing with a three-bay porch.  The structure was moved to a five-acre site in McPherson Park to prevent its demolition.

The Kilgore-Lewis House serves as the headquarters for the Greenville Council of Garden Clubs, which provides tours of the house, arboretum and gardens.

It was added to the National Register of Historic Places in 1975.

References

External links
 Kilgore-Lewis House - Greenville Council of Garden Clubs

Houses on the National Register of Historic Places in South Carolina
Palladian Revival architecture in the United States
Houses completed in 1838
Houses in Greenville, South Carolina
National Register of Historic Places in Greenville, South Carolina
Museums in Greenville County, South Carolina
Tourist attractions in Greenville, South Carolina
Historic house museums in South Carolina